

Legislative Assembly elections

Manipur

Nagaland

Odisha

Source:

Puducherry

Source:

Uttar Pradesh

References

External links

 Election Commission of India

1974 elections in India
India
1974 in India
Elections in India by year